Jamadi (also Romanized as Jamādī) is a village in Sardabeh Rural District, in the Central District of Ardabil County, Ardabil Province, Iran. In the 2006 census, the population of Jamadi was 357, with 66 families.

References 

Towns and villages in Ardabil County